Empire Boy was an  coastal tanker which was built in 1941 for the Ministry of War Transport (MoWT). Completed in December 1941, was transferred to the Dutch Government in 1942 and renamed Doorman. In 1947, she was sold into Dutch merchant service and renamed Flandria. In 1952, she was sold to a West German company and renamed Alice. She was lengthened in 1954 and renamed Hammonia and was later renamed Petra. In 1962, she was sold to an Italian company and renamed Anny. A new engine was fitted in 1965 and she was renamed Tosco in 1971, serving until scrapped in 1975.

Description
The ship was built by Goole Shipbuilding & Repairing Co Ltd, Goole. She was yard number 361. Launched on 25 August 1941, she was completed in December 1941.

The engine was built by Amos & Smith Ltd, Hull. In 1965, the ship was re-engined with a  6-cylinder Klöckner Humboldt Deutz diesel engine which had cylinders of 32 cm bore by 45 cm stroke.

Career

Empire Boy's port of registry was Goole. She was operated under the management of F T Everard & Co Ltd. In 1942, Empire Boy was transferred to the Dutch Government and renamed Doorman. Her port of registry was The Hague. She was operated under the management of the Netherlands Shipping and Trading Committee. Management was transferred to NV Hollandsche Stoomboot Maatschappij in 1944. Doorman was a member of a number of convoys during the Second World War.

KX 13
Convoy KX 13 departed from Milford Haven on 8 January 1944 and arrived at Gibraltar on 18 January.

In 1947, Doorman was sold to NV Phs. Van Ommeren, Rotterdam. Her port of registry was Rotterdam. In 1948, she was sold Verenigde Tankkustvaart NV.

In 1951, Flandria was sold to Ulric Thomas and was renamed Alice. She was operated under the management of S Stein KG. Her port of registry was Hamburg. In 1952, she was sold to Bauermann & Metzendorf GmbH and renamed Hammonia. In 1954, Alice was sold to Regia Reederei & Warenhandel GmbH and was renamed Petra. She was sold in 1957 to Rex Bauermann, operating under the  management of Olea Tankschiff GmbH. In 1962, Petra was sold to Vittorio Rosetti and was renamed Anny. Her port of registry was changed to Livorno. In 1965, a new diesel engine was fitted. In 1971, she was renamed Tosco and her port of registry was changed to Cagliari. She was sold to Tosco Sardi di Navigazione SpA in 1975. Tosco was scrapped at La Spezia in June 1975 by Demolizione Decomar SpA.

Official Numbers and Code Letters

Official Numbers were a forerunner to IMO Numbers. Empire Boy and Doorman had the UK Official Number 168714. Anny had the Italian Official Number 535 and  Tosco had the Italian Official Number 359. Both Anny and Tosco were assigned the IMO Number 5019331.

Empire Boy used the Code Letters BCVJ. Doorman used the Code Letters PDNO, which were changed to PDRO in 1944. Flandria used the Code Letters PCEF.

References

1941 ships
Ships built in Goole
Empire ships
Ministry of War Transport ships
Steamships of the United Kingdom
Steamships of the Netherlands
World War II merchant ships of the Netherlands
Steamships of West Germany
Merchant ships of West Germany
Steamships of Italy
Merchant ships of Italy